William of Joinville (French Guillaume de Joinville; died 1226) was a French ecclesiastic. A younger son of Geoffrey IV of Joinville and Helvide of Dampierre, he joined the chapter of Châlons Cathedral, become archdeacon by 1191. He then became bishop of Langres and thus a pair de France in 1208 and finally archbishop of Reims in 1219. He was the candidate of King Philip Augustus to become bishop of Metz in 1212, but lost out to Conrad III of Scharfenberg.

Sources

1226 deaths
Bishops of Langres
Archbishops of Reims
13th-century Roman Catholic archbishops in France
Year of birth unknown
13th-century peers of France